Andrzej Kazimierz Towpik (born 1 February 1939 in Brest) is a Polish diplomat.

He served as an ambassador to the United Nations (2004-2010), as well as the country's permanent representative to NATO (1997-2002). He was also Under Secretary of State at the Ministry of Foreign Affairs (1994-1997) and at the Ministry of National Defence (2003-2004).

He was awarded with Commander's (2009) and Officer's (1998) Crosses of the Order of Polonia Restituta. He received the Order of the White Star, 2nd class (2002).

References 

1939 births
Commanders of the Order of Polonia Restituta
Living people
Officers of the Order of Polonia Restituta
Polish politicians
Permanent Representatives of Poland to the United Nations
Permanent Representatives of Poland to NATO
People from Polesie Voivodeship
People from Brest, Belarus
Recipients of the Order of the White Star, 2nd Class